Simon Bodenmann (born 2 March 1988) is a Swiss professional ice hockey forward who is currently playing for the ZSC Lions of the National League (NL).

Playing career
Bodenmann joined Bern after spending the first 9 professional seasons of his career with fellow Swiss club, the Kloten Flyers. He signed a three-year contract to commence from the 2015–16 season on August 28, 2014.

On November 2, 2017, Bodenmann was signed to a four-year contract worth CHF 3.2 million by the ZSC Lions. The contract will begin from the 2018–19 season.

International play
Bodenmann competed in the 2013 IIHF World Championship, 2015 IIHF World Championship and the 2014 Winter Olympics as a member of the Switzerland men's national ice hockey team.

Career statistics

Regular season and playoffs

International

References

External links

1988 births
Living people
EHC Bülach players
SC Bern players
Ice hockey players at the 2014 Winter Olympics
EHC Kloten players
Olympic ice hockey players of Switzerland
Swiss ice hockey left wingers
Ice hockey players at the 2018 Winter Olympics
HC Thurgau players
ZSC Lions players